Brook Farm may refer to:

in the United Kingdom
Brook Farm (Thornton-Cleveleys, Lancashire), a farmhouse

in the United States
(by state)
Brook Farm, the site of a utopian transcendentalist community in the West Roxbury neighborhood of Boston, Massachusetts, listed on the NRHP in Massachusetts
Brook Farm (Skaneateles, New York), listed on the NRHP in New York
Brook Farm (Cavendish, Vermont), listed on the NRHP in Vermont

See also
Brook House (disambiguation)
Brooks House (disambiguation)
Brooks Farm, Troy, Michigan, listed on the NRHP in Oakland County, Michigan
Brook Hill Farm, Forest, Virginia, listed on the NRHP in Bedford County, Virginia